Deerhorn Valley is a valley in San Diego County, California. It extends from Lyons Peak in the west to Barber Mountain and Elena Mountain in the north-east.

References

Canyons and gorges of California
Valleys of San Diego County, California